Mizukawa is a Japanese surname. Notable people with the surname include:

Asami Mizukawa (born 1983), Japanese actress
Yaeko Mizukawa
Tomoyoshi Mizukawa

Japanese-language surnames